The P30 is a polymer framed semi-automatic handgun by Heckler & Koch, available in 9×19mm Parabellum and .40 S&W.

History
Early prototypes of the P30 were referred to as the P3000. The P30 is marketed by the manufacturer as a law enforcement service pistol.

In 2006 the first customer of the P30, the German Federal Customs Administration procured 13,500 P30s for its forces. The Norwegian Police Service ordered about 7,000 P30s.

In October 2008, the cantonal police of Zurich, Switzerland purchased an undisclosed number of P30s for 1.6 million CHF (US$1.35 million), replacing the previously used SIG P228.

In late November 2008, the German Bundespolizei ordered 30,000 P30s with the option for another 5,000. Deliveries took place between summer 2009 and 2011.

In April 2010, the state police of Hessen (Germany) ordered the P30 V2. This model was also supplied to Hessen prison officers.

In 2011 the P30 NL (H3) variant was among a few pistols under consideration for Dutch police service. However in October 2012 the Walther P99Q NL (H3) was selected to succeed the Walther P5 and Glock 17 pistols previously in use, in 2013-2014.

Variants
The P30L is a P30 featuring a longer slide and barrel. (The L stands for long slide)
The P30SK is a subcompact P30 featuring a shorter slide and barrel. (SK stands for "subkompakt")

The P30S, P30LS and P30SKS variants feature an optional external ambidextrous thumb safety. This manual safety is available for most trigger variants.

The P30, P30L and P30SK pistols offer multiple trigger configurations. It is possible to change the (original) trigger configuration of a P30 series pistol to another trigger configuration.

P30 trigger and model configurations
In addition to classic DA/SA trigger (V3) variants, Heckler and Koch features a proprietary Combat Defensive Action (CDA) or Law Enforcement Modification (LEM) in their P30 line, which is a variant of conventional Double Action Only (DAO) triggers.

The LEM mechanism operates via a combination of a cocking piece inside the hammer and an elbow spring to create a condition 0 or 1, while the hammer is placed in a hammer-down position. After racking the slide to chamber a round, the LEM versions produce a long Double Action trigger pull with the pull weight comparable to a Single Action.

Users

Current users 
: Used by Police Rapid Response Unit (Finland)
: 
German Federal Customs Administration: 13,500 pistols were purchased. 
 Federal Police: 30,000 V2 pistols were purchased with an option for another 5,000. 38 455 pistols in use as of 2019
 Approx. 16,000 P30 V2 pistols were ordered for the Hesse State Police and Hessian corrections officers.
 German Army: Used by the Feldjäger and commando soldiers of the Kommando Spezialkräfte (Special Forces Command; abbreviated KSK)
German Navy: Used by operators of the Kommando Spezialkräfte Marine/Kampfschwimmer  ("Naval Special Forces Command"; "Combat Swimmers"; abbreviated KSM)
: Used by Hungarian National Tax and Customs Administration 
: Used by Pasukan Khas Laut (PASKAL) counter-terrorism forces of the Royal Malaysian Navy.
: Norwegian Police Service. - being replaced with SIG Sauer P320
: Used by Portuguese Army, Public Security Police and Republican National Guard since 2009.
: Standard issue pistol for the Singaporean Army, replacing the SIG P226 as of 2021  
: Mossos d'Esquadra.
: Swiss Border Guard, at least six Cantonal police forces like the Kantonspolizei Zürich and at least one municipal police department (municipal police of Winterthur).
: P30L V1 used by Border Patrol Tactical Unit.

Former users 
: Used by Loudoun County Sheriff's Office 2012-2016; replaced by Sig Sauer P320

Failed bids 
 : 19 pistols evaluated as a replacement for the Browning L9A1 pistol, lost to the Glock 17.

See also 
Heckler & Koch HK45—Chambered in .45 ACP, it shares HK's current design aesthetic with the P30, as well as similar design principles.

References

External links 
P30 page from the Heckler & Koch Group website
Official P30L page from the Heckler & Koch Group website
'P30 Series' user manual, includes the P30
2008 Heckler & Koch Military and LE brochure
HKPro page on the P30
Home Page of HK USA, which has a link to the P30 and P30L
Modern Firearms - Heckler & Koch HK P30 pistol (Germany)
Reports on a Heckler & Koch P30 9x19mm Parabellum endurance test over 91,322 rounds conducted by pistol-training.com
Die Pistole P30 (German)

.40 S&W semi-automatic pistols
9mm Parabellum semi-automatic pistols
Heckler & Koch pistols
Post–Cold War weapons of Germany
Police weapons